Gainsborough was an Urban District in Parts of Lindsey, Lincolnshire, England from 1894 to 1974. It was created under the Local Government Act 1894.

The district was abolished in 1974 under the Local Government Act 1972 and combined with various other local government districts in the western part of Lindsey to form the new West Lindsey district.

References

Districts of England created by the Local Government Act 1894
Districts of England abolished by the Local Government Act 1972
Urban districts of Lindsey
Urban districts of England
Gainsborough, Lincolnshire